The 1992 Maceió Open (aka Chevrolet Classic or Chevrolet Open) was an ATP tournament played on clay courts. It was the only edition of the Maceió Open and was part of the ATP World Series of the 1992 ATP Tour. It was held in Maceió, Brazil at Praia da Pajuçara, from February 3 through February 10, 1992.

Finals

Singles

 Tomás Carbonell defeated  Christian Miniussi 7–6(14–12), 5–7, 6–2
 It was Carbonell's 1st title of the year and the 7th of his career.

Doubles

 Gabriel Markus /  John Sobel defeated  Ricardo Acioly /  Mauro Menezes 6–4, 1–6, 7–5
 It was Markus' 1st title of the year and the 1st of his career. It was Sobel's only title of the year and the 1st of his career.

External links

 
1992 ATP Tour
1992 in tennis
Maceió Open
Maceió Open